John Clarke MacDermott, Baron MacDermott, PC (NI) (12 April 1896 – 13 July 1979), was a Northern Irish politician and lawyer who was Lord Chief Justice of Northern Ireland from 1951 to 1971.

Biography 
Born in 1896, MacDermott was educated at Campbell College, Belfast, and the Queen's University of Belfast. After serving with the Machine Guns Corps in France, Belgium and Germany during the First World War, for which he was awarded the Military Cross and reached the rank of Lieutenant, MacDermott was called to the Bar of Ireland in 1921.

Eight years later he was appointed to determine industrial assurance disputes in Northern Ireland, and in 1931 he became a lecturer in Jurisprudence at Queen's University, teaching for four years. 

In 1936 he was made a King's Counsel, and two years later he was elected to the Northern Ireland House of Commons as an Ulster Unionist member for Queen's University.

In 1940, MacDermott was appointed Minister of Public Security in the Government of Northern Ireland, and the following year became the Attorney General for Northern Ireland. He was succeeded in this post by William Lowry, whose son, Lord Lowry, would eventually succeed MacDermott as Lord Chief Justice. In 1944 he resigned his parliamentary seat on appointment as a High Court Judge for Northern Ireland, and three years later, on 23 April 1947 was made a Lord of Appeal in Ordinary, becoming a life peer as Baron MacDermott, of Belmont in the City of Belfast.

Lord MacDermott returned from the House of Lords to take up his appointment as Lord Chief Justice of Northern Ireland; his successors to the latter office have become Law Lords subsequently. Whilst LCJ, he was affectionately known as "the Baron".

In 1977, aged over eighty, Lord MacDermott offered to redeliver a lecture at the Ulster College, which had been interrupted by a bomb meant for him and which had severely wounded him.

Having been made a Northern Ireland Privy Counsellor seven years earlier, Lord MacDermott was sworn of the British Privy Council in 1947.

Four years later, in 1951, he was appointed Lord Chief Justice of Northern Ireland, a post he held for twenty years. He was also Pro-Chancellor of his alma mater from 1951 to 1969. In 1958, he chaired the commission on the Isle of Man Constitution. He died in 1979.

In 1926, he wed Louise Palmer Johnston, later Lady MacDermott. Their son, Sir John MacDermott, was also sworn into the British Privy Council in 1987, as a Lord Justice of Appeal in Northern Ireland. He later became a Surveillance Commissioner for Northern Ireland.

See also
 List of Northern Ireland Members of the House of Lords

References

External links 
 

1896 births
1979 deaths
Law lords
Ulster Unionist Party members of the House of Commons of Northern Ireland
Alumni of Queen's University Belfast
Academics of Queen's University Belfast
Members of the Privy Council of Northern Ireland
Members of the Privy Council of the United Kingdom
Members of the House of Commons of Northern Ireland 1938–1945
Northern Ireland Cabinet ministers (Parliament of Northern Ireland)
British Army personnel of World War I
Irish people of World War I
Machine Gun Corps officers
Recipients of the Military Cross
People educated at Campbell College
Attorneys General for Northern Ireland
Northern Ireland junior government ministers (Parliament of Northern Ireland)
Lord chief justices of Northern Ireland
Members of the Judicial Committee of the Privy Council
High Court judges of Northern Ireland
Members of the House of Commons of Northern Ireland for Queen's University of Belfast
Life peers created by George VI